The 2019 Tulane Green Wave baseball team represented Tulane University in the 2019 NCAA Division I baseball season. The Green Wave played their home games at Greer Field at Turchin Stadium.

Roster

Coaching staff

Schedule

! style="" | Regular Season
|- valign="top" 

|- bgcolor="#ccffcc"
| 1 || February 15 || George Washington || Greer Field at Turchin Field • New Orleans, LA || W 3–2 || 1–0 ||
|- bgcolor="#ccffcc"
| 2 || February 16 || George Washington || Greer Field at Turchin Stadium • New Orleans, LA || W 7–6 (13 inn) || 2–0 ||
|- bgcolor="#ccffcc"
| 3 || February 17 || George Washington || Greer Field at Turchin Stadium • New Orleans, LA || W 16-6 || 3–0 || 
|- bgcolor="#ccffcc"
| 4 || February 19 || Lamar || Greer Field at Turchin Stadium • New Orleans, LA || W 9–1 || 4–0 ||
|- bgcolor="#ccffcc"
| 5 || February 20 || Lamar || Greer Field at Turchin Stadium • New Orleans, LA || W 22–10 || 5–0 ||
|- bgcolor="#ffcccc"
| 6 || February 22 || #10 Ole Miss || Greer Field at Turchin Stadium • New Orleans, LA || L 4–6 || 5–1 ||
|- bgcolor="#ccffcc"
| 7 || February 23 || #10 Ole Miss || Greer Field at Turchin Stadium • New Orleans, LA || W 13–12 || 6–1 ||
|- bgcolor="#ffcccc"
| 8 || February 24 || #10 Ole Miss || Greer Field at Turchin Stadium • New Orleans, LA || L 3–6 || 6–2 ||
|- bgcolor="#ccffcc"
| 9 || February 26 || at Nicholls || Ben Meyer Diamond at Ray E. Didier Field • Thibodaux, LA || W 7-4 || 7–2 ||
|-

|- bgcolor="#ccffcc"
| 10 || March 1 || vs. Dartmouth (Army Invitational) || USA Baseball National Training Complex • Cary, NC || W 5–1 || 8–2 ||
|- bgcolor="#ccffcc"
| 11 || March 2 || vs. Saint Joseph's (Army Invitational) || USA Baseball National Training Complex • Cary, NC || W 12-7 || 9–2 ||
|- bgcolor="#ffcccc"
| 12 || March 3 || vs. Army (Army Invitational) || USA Baseball National Training Complex • Cary, NC || L 6–7 || 9–3 ||
|- bgcolor="#ccffcc"
| 13 || March 6 || Texas Southern || Greer Field at Turchin Stadium • New Orleans, LA || W 13–1 || 10–3 ||
|- bgcolor="#ffcccc"
| 14 || March 8 || UC Santa Barbara || Greer Field at Turchin Stadium • New Orleans, LA || L 4–7 || 10-4 ||
|- bgcolor="#ffcccc"
| 15 || March 9 || UC Santa Barbara || Greer Field at Turchin Stadium • New Orleans, LA || L 7–8 || 10–5 ||
|- bgcolor="#ffcccc"
| 16 || March 10 || UC Santa Barbara || Greer Field at Turchin Stadium • New Orleans, LA || L 6–16 || 10–6 ||
|- bgcolor="#ccffcc"
| 17 || March 12 || McNeese State || Greer Field at Turchin Stadium • New Orleans, LA || W 9-3 || 11–6 ||
|- bgcolor="#ccffcc"
| 18 || March 16 || UC Riverside || Greer Field at Turchin Stadium • New Orleans, LA || W 10-1 || 12–6 ||
|- bgcolor="#ffcccc"
| 19 || March 16 || UC Riverside || Greer Field at Turchin Stadium • New Orleans, LA || L 1-10 || 12–7 ||
|- bgcolor="#ccffcc"
| 20 || March 17 || UC Riverside || Greer Field at Turchin Stadium • New Orleans, LA || W 10-0 || 13–7 ||
|- bgcolor="#ccffcc"
| 21 || March 20 || Louisiana || Greer Field at Turchin Stadium • New Orleans, LA || W 7-3 || 14–7 ||
|- bgcolor="#ccffcc"
| 22 || March 22 || Houston Baptist || Greer Field at Turchin Stadium • New Orleans, LA || W 6–2 || 15–7 ||
|- align="center" bgcolor="#ccffcc
| 23 || March 23 || Houston Baptist || Greer Field at Turchin Stadium • New Orleans, LA || W 3–2 (11 inn) || 16–7 ||
|- bgcolor="#ccffcc"
| 24 || March 24 || Houston Baptist || Greer Field at Turchin Stadium • New Orleans, LA || W 3–1 || 17–7 ||
|- bgcolor="#ffcccc"
| 25 || March 26 || at Louisiana || M. L. Tigue Moore Field at Russo Park • Lafayette, LA || L 6–7 || 17–8 ||
|- bgcolor="#ccffcc"
| 26 || March 29 || at Cincinnati || Marge Schott Stadium • Cincinnati, OH || W 19–4 || 18–8 || 1-0
|- bgcolor="#ccffcc"
| 27 || March 29 || at Cincinnati || Marge Schott Stadium • Cincinnati, OH || W 8–1 || 19–8 || 2–0
|- bgcolor="#ffcccc"
| 28 || March 31 || at Cincinnati || Marge Schott Stadium • Cincinnati, OH || L 6–7 || 19–9 || 2–1
|-

|- bgcolor="#ffcccc"
| 29 || April 2 || at New Orleans || Maestri Field at Privateer Park • New Orleans, LA || L 7–8 || 19–10 ||
|- bgcolor="#ffcccc"
| 30 || April 5 || Wichita State || Greer Field at Turchin Stadium • New Orleans, LA || L 11–12 (11 inn) || 19–11 || 2–2
|- bgcolor="#ccffcc"
| 31 || April 6 || Wichita State || Greer Field at Turchin Stadium • New Orleans, LA || W 12–6 || 20–11 || 3-2
|- bgcolor="#ccffcc"
| 32 || April 7 || Wichita State || Greer Field at Turchin Stadium • New Orleans, LA || W 8–4 || 21–11 || 4–2
|- bgcolor="#ccffcc"
| 33 || April 9 || at Southeastern Louisiana || Pat Kenelly Diamond at Alumni Field • Hammond, LA || W 15–14 || 22–11 ||
|- bgcolor="#ccffcc"
| 34 || April 12 || South Florida || Greer Field at Turchin Stadium • New Orleans, LA || W 9–2 || 23–11 || 5–2
|- bgcolor="#ccffcc"
| 35 || April 13 || South Florida || Greer Field at Turchin Stadium • New Orleans, LA || W 20–11 || 24–11 || 6-2
|- bgcolor="#ccffcc"
| 36 || April 14 || South Florida || Greer Field at Turchin Stadium • New Orleans, LA || W 6-4 || 25–11 || 7–2
|- bgcolor="#ffcccc"
| 37 || April 16 || at New Orleans || Maestri Field at Privateer Park • New Orleans, LA || L 10–15 || 25–12 ||
|- bgcolor="#cccccc"
| 38 || April 19 || at Memphis || FedExPark • Memphis, TN || colspan=4 |Game canceled
|- bgcolor="#ffcccc"
| 39 || April 20 || at Memphis || FedExPark • Memphis, TN || L 8–11 (7 inn) || 25–13 || 7-3
|- bgcolor="#ccffcc"
| 40 || April 20 || at Memphis || FedExPark • Memphis, TN || W 20–5 (7 inn) || 26–13 || 8-3
|- bgcolor="#ffcccc"
| 41 || April 23 || Southeastern Louisiana || Greer Field at Turchin Stadium • New Orleans, LA || L 3–10 || 26–14 ||
|- bgcolor="#ffcccc"
| 42 || April 26 || at #11 East Carolina || Clark-LeClair Stadium • Greenville, NC || L 0–14 || 26–15 || 8–4
|- bgcolor="#ffcccc"
| 43 || April 27 || at #11 East Carolina || Clark-LeClair Stadium • Greenville, NC || L 2–8 || 26–16 || 8–5
|- bgcolor="#ccffcc"
| 44 || April 28 || at #11 East Carolina || Clark-LeClair Stadium • Greenville, NC || W 9–8 || 27–16 || 9–5
|- bgcolor="#ffcccc"
| 45 || April 30 || New Orleans || Greer Field at Turchin Stadium • New Orleans, LA || L 9–14 || 27–17 ||
|-

|- bgcolor="#ccffcc"
| 46 || May 3 || UCF || Greer Field at Turchin Stadium • New Orleans, LA || W 6–2 || 28–17 || 10-5
|- bgcolor="#ffcccc"
| 47 || May 4 || UCF || Greer Field at Turchin Stadium • New Orleans, LA || L 2-4 || 28–18 || 10–6
|- bgcolor="#ffcccc"
| 48 || May 5 || UCF || Greer Field at Turchin Stadium • New Orleans, LA || L 2–5 || 28–19 || 10–7
|- bgcolor="#ffcccc"
| 49 || May 7 || Nicholls || Greer Field at Turchin Stadium • New Orleans, LA || L 3–5 || 28–20 ||
|- bgcolor="#ffcccc"
| 50 || May 11 || at Houston || Schroeder Park • Houston, TX || L 7–12 || 28–21 || 10-8
|- bgcolor="#ccffcc"
| 51 || May 11 || at Houston || Schroeder Park • Houston, TX || W 9–7 || 29–21 || 11–8
|- bgcolor="#ffcccc"
| 52 || May 12 || at Houston || Schroeder Park • Houston, TX || L 2-5 || 29-22 || 11-9
|- bgcolor="#ccffcc"
| 53 || May 14 || South Alabama || Greer Field at Turchin Stadium • New Orleans, LA || W 11–1 (7 inn) || 30–22 ||
|- bgcolor="#ffcccc"
| 54 || May 16 || UConn || Greer Field at Turchin Stadium • New Orleans, LA || L 5–8 || 30–23 || 11–10
|- bgcolor="#ffcccc"
| 55 || May 17 || UConn || Greer Field at Turchin Stadium • New Orleans, LA || L 6–10 || 30–24 || 11–11
|- bgcolor="#ccffcc"
| 56 || May 18 || UConn || Greer Field at Turchin Stadium • New Orleans, LA || W 8–6 || 31–24 || 12–11
|-

|-
! style="" | Post-Season
|- valign="top" 

|- bgcolor="#ccffcc"
| 57 || May 21 || vs. UCF || Spectrum Field • Clearwater, FL || W 5–2 || 32–24 ||
|- bgcolor="#ffcccc"
| 58 || May 23 || vs. Cincinnati || Spectrum Field • Clearwater, FL || L 4-8 || 32-25 ||
|- bgcolor="#ffcccc"
| 59 || May 24 || vs. UCF || Spectrum Field • Clearwater, FL || L 2-6 || 32-26 ||
|-

|- 
|

References

Tulane Green Wave
Tulane Green Wave baseball seasons
Tulane baseball